Pyongyang Sinri Primary School is a model primary school in Pyongyang, North Korea. 

Prominent alumni include Pae Kil-su, Olympic pommel horse gold medalist in 1992.

External links 
 kcckp.net

Schools in North Korea
Education in Pyongyang